Carlos Checa Carrera (born 15 October 1972) is a Spanish former professional motorcycle road racer and winner of the 2011 Superbike World Championship. He has two Grand Prix victories.

Career

125cc, 250cc, 500cc & MotoGP World Championship
In , he moved up to the Blue Riband 500cc class as a replacement for Alberto Puig, a fellow Spaniard who broke both his legs in a horrifying crash in France. Checa shocked the paddock by being on the pace and nearly winning the Barcelona race.

He continued with the team until 1998, the year he suffered near fatal injuries with a crash at Donington Park's Craner Curves and was initially thought to have suffered only scrapes and bruises before complaining of pain. Hours later he had lost his vision, needed emergency surgery to remove his spleen and was listed in critical condition. He fought back to ride that year, missing just one race, before racing for Yamaha as Max Biaggi's teammate on two-strokes and four-strokes. He nearly won many races but had a habit of crashing after taking the lead. One such race was at Rio de Janeiro in 2002 when he stalled on the starting line, then rode through the field to take the lead only to crash a corner later.

In 2006 he returned to the Tech 3 Yamaha team, proving much steadier than in previous years and comfortably beating teammate James Ellison, but was not much a threat to the rest of the field, as they were on Dunlop tyres. He struggled as the sole LCR Honda rider in 2007, with the 800cc Honda proving uncompetitive for many riders. At the Sachsenring Checa got an updated frame, which other non-works Honda riders had found uncompetitive – this is believed to be due to Checa using the same Michelin tyres as the works team, the other Hondas being on Bridgestones.

Superbike World Championship
For the  season, Checa left MotoGP to join the Ten Kate Honda team in the Superbike World Championship as a replacement for  champion James Toseland. At Valencia he challenged Max Neukirchner for the win at the final corner, resulting in a collision which broke Neukirchner's collarbone. Checa's first two wins – following four podium finishes – both came in the meeting at Miller Motorsports Park in Salt Lake City on 1 June 2008. He did not reach the podium again, but consistent results elsewhere allowed him to finish fifth in the championship. He also won the Suzuka 8 Hours with teammate Ryuichi Kiyonari.

In , Checa struggled to compete for much of the season, securing just four podium finishes and finishing seventh in the riders' standings, 32 points behind satellite Honda rider Leon Haslam. During the 2009 season, Ten Kate Honda announced that they would be downsizing their operation from three riders to just two. Both Checa and Ryuichi Kiyonari were released, with Jonathan Rea retained and Max Neukirchner joining the team from Suzuki.

In November 2009, Checa was confirmed as a rider at the Althea Ducati team, where he would race alongside Shane Byrne. He scored Althea's first win at the season opening meeting at Phillip Island, and was on course for victories in both races at Miller Motorsports Park in the United States before suffering mystery mechanical failures in both races. Checa went on to win the Italian round at Imola and finished the season in third place in the  championship.

Checa dominated the opening round of the  season, winning both races comfortably at Phillip Island on his Ducati 1098R. He won thirteen more times and was crowned the 2011 World Superbike Champion at the penultimate round at the Magny-Cours circuit in France, becoming the first Spaniard and only the third European rider from outside of the United Kingdom after Raymond Roche and Max Biaggi to have done so.

Career statistics

Grand Prix motorcycle racing

By season

By class

Races by year
(key) (Races in bold indicate pole position, races in italics indicate fastest lap)

Superbike World Championship

By season

Races by year
(key) (Races in bold indicate pole position, races in italics indicate fastest lap)

Suzuka 8 Hours results

References

External links

carloscheca.com Official website

1972 births
Living people
Spanish motorcycle racers
Motorcycle racers from Catalonia
Ducati Corse MotoGP riders
Yamaha Motor Racing MotoGP riders
500cc World Championship riders
250cc World Championship riders
125cc World Championship riders
Superbike World Championship riders
Sportspeople from Barcelona
Tech3 MotoGP riders
Pramac Racing MotoGP riders
LCR Team MotoGP riders
MotoGP World Championship riders
World Rallycross Championship drivers